Rafael Valle González (born March 1, 1938 in San Juan, Puerto Rico) is a Puerto Rican retired professional basketball player. In the 1950s and 1960s, he played with the Cangrejeros de Santurce and the Santos de San Juan teams in the Puerto Rican National Basketball League.

During that time, he was also a member of the Puerto Rican national basketball team, leading the team to a 13th place at the 1960 Summer Olympics in Rome, where he scored 127 points in seven games. In 1956, he was the highest scorer of the league, with 693 points in 24 games, for an average of 28.5 points per game.

In 2008, he was selected as one of the 12 best players in Puerto Rican basketball history between 1920 and 1969. In a recent interview, Coach Flor Meléndez picked Valle as part of his all-time Puerto Rican starting five in the power forward position along with PG. Pachín Vicens, SG. Neftalí Rivera, SF. Raymond Dalmau, C. José ‘Piculín’ Ortiz. 

Valle was 1.93m tall and weighed 91 kg.

References

1938 births
Puerto Rican men's basketball players
1963 FIBA World Championship players
Basketball players at the 1960 Summer Olympics
Basketball players at the 1963 Pan American Games
Olympic basketball players of Puerto Rico
Baloncesto Superior Nacional players
Living people
Pan American Games medalists in basketball
Pan American Games bronze medalists for Puerto Rico
Medalists at the 1963 Pan American Games